Jingtong is a locale in Pingxi District, New Taipei City, Taiwan. Originally a coal mining town, today it is known mostly for tourism, with numerous souvenir shops and exhibits on the history of the area and the coal mining industry.

Tourist attractions
 Jingtong Coal Memorial Park
 Jingtong Mining Industry Museum
 Jingtong Old Street
 Jingtong Railway Story House

Transportation

Jingtong Station was built by the Japanese in the 1930s. The town is a terminus of the Pingxi Line of the Taiwan Railways Administration.

See also

 New Taipei City

References

Geography of New Taipei
Tourist attractions in New Taipei